Soward is a surname of English origin. Notable people with the surname include:

George Klewitz Soward (1857–1941), Australian architect and politician 
Jamie Soward (born 1984), Australian rugby league player
R. Jay Soward (born 1978), American football player

See also
Sowards

Surnames of English origin